The Primetime Emmy Award for Outstanding Documentary or Nonfiction Series is handed out annually at the Creative Arts Emmy Award ceremony. The award was established in 2013 as the awards restructured previous categories for Outstanding Nonfiction Series and Outstanding Nonfiction Special. The category was called Outstanding Nonfiction Series from 1998–2012. Prior to 1998, the category was called Outstanding Informational Series.

Winners and nominations

1990s

2000s

2010s

2020s

Programs with multiple wins

10 wins
 American Masters

2 wins
 American Experience
 Planet Earth

Programs with multiple nominations

20 nominations
 American Masters

15 nominations
 Biography 

13 nominations
 Inside the Actors Studio  

5 nominations
 Deadliest Catch 

4 nominations
 American Experience
 Behind the Music

3 nominations
 Anthony Bourdain: No Reservations
 Chef's Table
 30 for 30

2 nominations
 Cold Case Files
 E! True Hollywood Story
 Pioneers of Television
 Planet Earth
 This American Life

Total awards by network

 PBS – 15
 Netflix – 3
 Showtime – 2
 Disney+  – 2
 A&E – 1
 BBC America – 1
 Discovery – 1
 ESPN – 1
 HBO – 1
 History – 1

Notes

References

Documentary or Nonfiction Series
American reality television series